Sergeant Major John Champe (ca. 1752 – 30 September 1798) was an American Revolutionary War senior enlisted soldier in the Continental Army who became a double agent in a failed attempt to capture the American traitor General Benedict Arnold (1741–1801).

Biography
Champe was born about 1752 near what is now Aldie in Loudoun County, Virginia.

Champe enlisted in the Virginia Cavalry from Loudoun County in 1776 and was made sergeant major in Lee's Legion, a unit commanded by (then Major) Henry Lee III, later and better known as Colonel "Light-Horse Harry" Lee (and father of Gen. Robert E. Lee). Champe's family was said to be well known to Major Lee. A plan was formulated to kidnap the defecting General Benedict Arnold and bring him back to American lines to face court martial. A key motivation for the operation was to obtain information as to the possibility of other high-ranking American officers being involved in the treasonous Arnold's activities. Handpicked by George Washington and Lee for the spy mission. In 1780, Champe "defected" to the British side where he was introduced to Arnold and soon gathered intelligence that established that there were no other American generals involved with Arnold. Champe formulated a plot to capture Arnold on his regular evening stroll, but before he could act the entire British unit, Champe included, embarked in New York on the Virginia campaign of 1780–1781. Thus, the whole endeavor had to be called off.

After the failed attempt, Champe served in the British Army for many months before finding a way to escape back to the Continental Army. Upon rejoining the Americans, Champe voiced a desire to continue his service fighting the British, but Lee dissuaded him from it — pointing out that if captured, he could now be hanged as a spy. Nevertheless, Lee believed that Champe had acquitted himself well and had him discharged honorably from the Continental Army.

According to Legends of Loudoun: An Account of the History and Homes of a Border County of Virginia's Northern Neck (1938) by Harrison Williams:

...after the war, it is said on the personal recommendation of General Washington, Sergeant Champe was appointed to the position of doorkeeper or sergeant-of-arms of the Continental Congress, then meeting at Philadelphia, but obliged, on account of rioting, to remove to Trenton. His name appears on the rolls of August 25, 1783 as holding that position. Soon afterwards, he returned to Loudoun County, married and acquired a small holding near what is now Dover, between the later towns of Aldie and Middleburg, close to the present Little River Turnpike.

Champe may also have spent time in Kentucky. He and his wife had seven children. Champe then moved to Augusta (now Pendleton) County, then in Virginia, today in West Virginia. A local tradition, maintained by Champe's descendants, is that he had been promised a grant of lands in the area, but never received it. He died in poverty, unable to care for two of his sons, John and Thomas, who as teenagers were apprenticed to a tannery at Mouth of Seneca.

Champe died on September 30, 1798 while staying at Prickett's Fort — near what is now Fairmont, West Virginia — on a trip to (according to different accounts) consider a land purchase or visit one of his children. He was buried near the fort, but the exact location of his grave remains unknown.

Legacy

Family
Champe's wife was Phebe Susan Barnard who, beginning in 1831 and then living in Ohio, received a pension of $120 annually based upon her husband's war service.

Family Tree

|-
|style="text-align: left;"|Notes:

Namesakes
In the American Civil War, the Confederate rifle company from Aldie, Virginia, "Champe's Rifles", named themselves in honor of Champe.
Namesake for new John Champe High School in Aldie, VA
Champe's Ford Road, a mile or two west of Aldie, Virginia, is named for John Champe's family.

Monuments
Historical markers to Sergeant Champe have been erected in at least three places:
Near Aldie in Loudoun County, Virginia, where he was born. 
In 1934, a marker was placed by U.S. Highway 15 (now U.S. 50) at a lay-by close to the few stones that remained from Champe's home. 
About 100 yards off US 50, an obelisk built in 1939 from the stones also stands nearby. It bears the inscription:
"Here was the house of Sergeant John Champe, Continental Army, who risked the inglorious death of a spy for the independence of his country."
At Champe Rocks, Pendleton County, West Virginia, where he settled after the War. (A reference to his gravesite here is an error.)
At Prickett's Fort, Marion County, West Virginia, near where he died and was buried. The marker here is not at his grave, but was placed on 22 April 2001, in a ceremony with full military honors.

Media 
Champe is a character in season four of the AMC television show Turn: Washington's Spies.

See also
 Intelligence in the American Revolutionary War
 Intelligence operations in the American Revolutionary War
 Jane Tuers
 Three Pigeons

Notes

Further reading
  McGroarty, William Buckner 1937. "Sergeant John Champe and Certain of His Contemporaries." The William and Mary Quarterly, Vol. 17, No. 2 (Apr., 1937), pp. 145–175.
 Hall, Wilbur C 1938. "Sergeant Champe's Adventure." The William and Mary Quarterly, Vol. 18, No. 3 (Jul., 1938), pp. 322–342.
 Rose, Alexander 2007. Washington's Spies: The Story of America's First Spy Ring. New York: Bantam Dell.
 McBurney, Christian 2016. Abductions in the American Revolution: Attempts to Kidnap George Washington, Benedict Arnold and Other Military and Civilian Leaders. Jefferson NC: McFarland.

External links
 John Champe at Find a grave
 Cenopath memorial to John Champe in Michigan

1752 births
1798 deaths
Virginia colonial people
Continental Army soldiers
Continental Army officers from Virginia
People from Aldie, Virginia
People from Pendleton County, West Virginia
Benedict Arnold
American spies during the American Revolution